Vige may refer to:

Silje Vige (born 1976), Norwegian singer
Sauviat-sur-Vige, French commune